Dionysius bar Salibi (died 1171) was Syriac Orthodox writer and bishop, who served as metropolitan of Amid, in Upper Mesopotamia, from 1166 to 1171. He was one of the most prominent and prolific writers within the Syriac Orthodox Church during the twelfth century.

He was a native of Malatia, on the upper Euphrates. His baptismal name was Jacob. He assumed name 'Dionysius' upon consecration to the episcopate. In 1154 he was created bishop of Marash by the patriarch Athanasius VII bar Qatra; a year later the diocese of Mabbug was added to his charge. In 1166, new patriarch Michael the Great, the successor of Athanasius, transferred him to the metropolitan see of Amid in Mesopotamia, and there he remained till his death in 1171.

Of his writings probably the most important are his exhaustive commentaries on the text of the Old and New Testaments, in which he skillfully interwove and summarized the interpretations of previous writers such as Ephrem the Syrian, Chrysostom, Cyril of Alexandria, Moses Bar-Kepha and John of Dara, whom he mentions together in the preface to his commentary on St Matthew. Among his other main works are a treatise against heretics, containing inter alia a polemic against the Jews and the Muslims; liturgical treatises, epistles and homilies.

His polemical works also include treatises on Melkites, and Armenians.

See also
 Alogi
 Syriac literature
 Dioceses of the Syriac Orthodox Church

References

Sources

External links
  Dionysius bar Salibi, In Apocalypsim, Actus et Epistulas Catholicas, trans. I. Sedlacek, Romae : Karolus de Luigi (1909).
 Dionysius bar Salibi: Commentary on the Apocalypse
 Dionysius Syrus (=Dionysius Bar Salibi): Commentary on Revelation (extracts). Hermathena, vol. 6 (1888) pp. 397–418, vol. 7 (1890) pp. 137–150; The Expositor 7th series, vol. 1 (1906), pp. 481–495.

Syriac writers
Christian anti-Gnosticism
1171 deaths
Year of birth unknown
Syriac Orthodox Church bishops
12th-century Oriental Orthodox archbishops